George Debaun Grundy Jr. (June 21, 1898 – May 19, 1998) was a pioneer aviator and the last living member of the Early Birds of Aviation.

Biography
Grundy was born June 21, 1898, in Southampton, New York, to Florence Reeves and he was raised in Richmond Hill, Queens. He had his first solo flight on September 17, 1916, on Long Island.

He died on May 19, 1998, in Leesburg, Florida.

References

Members of the Early Birds of Aviation
1898 births
1998 deaths
Aviators from New York (state)
People from Richmond Hill, Queens